Biggin can refer to:
Biggin (Dovedale and Parwich Ward), Derbyshire, in the Peak District
Biggin Hill a town in London
London Biggin Hill Airport an airport near Biggin Hill, London
Biggin by Hulland, Derbyshire, near Hulland
Biggin, North Yorkshire
Biggin, Warwickshire
Biggin, Essex
 a nightcap
coffee pot with a separate container to hold the ground coffee (named after its inventor)